Epistemological realism is a philosophical position, a subcategory of objectivism, holding that what can be known about an object exists independently of one's mind. It is opposed to epistemological idealism.

Epistemological realism is related directly to the correspondence theory of truth, which claims that the world exists independently and innately to our perceptions of it. Our sensory data then reflect or correspond to the innate world.

See also
Epistemic theories of truth
Epistemic optimism (in the philosophy of science)
Epistemology
Philosophical realism

References

Philosophical realism
Epistemological theories